Bank of the West Tower, also known as Five Hundred Capitol Mall, is a 25-story  high-rise in downtown Sacramento, California with a 10-level, 800 stall parking garage. The building consists of a 5-story atrium/lobby, ground floor retail, office space, and a 2-level penthouse restaurant or meeting facility. The structure has a steel frame and features a granite curtain wall with stone-on-precast and stone-on-truss panels on the exterior.  The building, opened for business and welcomed its first tenant on May 26, 2009.

Gallery

See also
List of tallest buildings in Sacramento

References

External links 

Bank of the West Tower at Rudolph and Sletten

Office buildings completed in 2009
Bank buildings in California
Skyscraper office buildings in Sacramento, California